Natakhtari is a village in the Mtskheta municipality, Mtskheta-Mtianeti region, Georgia. It is located in Eastern Georgia, on the right bank of the Aragvi river, at elevation of 510 m above sea level, 8 km north of the town of Mtskheta.

References

See also 
 Natakhtari Airfield

Populated places in Mtskheta Municipality